Taner Sağır (born 13 March 1985 in Kardzhali, Bulgaria) is a Turkish world and Olympic weightlifting champion. Coming into Athens as holder of all the junior world records at the age of only 19, he broke the Olympic records in the category –77 kg snatch, clean and jerk and total. He is seen as a great talent by authorities.

Early years
He was born in Bulgaria to parents of Turkish ethnicity. In 1989, the family emigrated to Turkey where they settled first in the Batıkent neighborhood of Yenimahalle, Ankara before later moving to Pursaklar, Ankara. In 1994, Taner began weightlifting in Pursaklar. Taner Sağır is the younger brother of Olympic weightlifter Nezir Sağır.

Sports career
Sağır, 1.70 m tall, is a student of physical education and sports. Muharrem Süleymanoğlu and Osman Nuri Vural coach him at the Demirspor Club in Ankara, Turkey.

As he is somewhat baby-faced, he was in a few commercials at the Athens Olympics in 2004.

He did not finish after three failures in the snatch event at the 2008 Summer Olympics.

He has not competed in a major event since 2008, owing to a spinal disc injury.

Family life
On 30 August 2008 he married Sibel Güler, a two-time European taekwondo champion and also an immigrant from Bulgaria. The couple has a child. The family resides in Ankara on a street named after him.

Medals
Olympics

World Championships

European Championships

Y: Youth (under 16)
J: Junior
JWR: Junior World record

World rank 
2004 World ranking list for the category "Men 77 kg" is as following:

References

External links
 

1985 births
Living people
Turkish male weightlifters
Bulgarian Turks in Turkey
Bulgarian emigrants to Turkey
Olympic weightlifters of Turkey
Olympic gold medalists for Turkey
Weightlifters at the 2004 Summer Olympics
Weightlifters at the 2008 Summer Olympics
People from Kardzhali
Olympic medalists in weightlifting
European champions in weightlifting
Medalists at the 2004 Summer Olympics
European champions for Turkey
European Weightlifting Championships medalists
World Weightlifting Championships medalists